Abbasabad (also Romanized as ‘Abbāsābād) is a village in Sarab Rural District, in the Central District of Sonqor County, Kermanshah Province, Iran. At the 2006 census, its population was 173, in 41 families.

References 

Populated places in Sonqor County